Alberto Colombo (November 27, 1888 – March 24, 1954) was an American composer and music director whose career spanned 20 years, from 1934 through 1953. At the 10th Academy Awards he was nominated for an Oscar in the category of Best Score for the film Portia on Trial.

Filmography
(as per AFI's database)

References

American filmographies